Gembira Loka Zoo is a zoological garden located in Yogyakarta, Special Region of Yogyakarta, Indonesia.  Gembira Loka Zoo was opened in 1956 and comprises a botanical garden, orchid nursery, artificial lake, children's park, numerous bridges across the Gajahwong River, and a collection of approximately 470 animals, most notable of which are its Komodo dragons, orangutans, gibbons, and hippopotamus. The park is 54 acres in size.

In 2019, a zone called Zona Cakar (Scratch zone) has opened, focusing on carnivores, especially cats.

Gembira Loka Zoo has received many new animals from various countries, such as six African penguins from Singapore Zoo and eight lesser flamingos from Tanzania.

Gembira Loka Zoo added 12 meerkats and a pair of African lions from Batu Secret Zoo on May 9, 2021.

Species

Mammals

 Sumatran elephant
 Sumatran tiger
 Javan leopard
 Bornean orangutan
 Chimpanzee
 Sun bear
 African lion
 Sunda clouded leopard
 Meerkat
 Pygmy hippopotamus
 Hippopotamus
 Malayan tapir
 Dromedary camel
 Chital
 Caracal
 Serval
 Fishing cat
 Nilgai
 Javan rusa
 Banded pig
 Java mouse-deer
 Wallaby
 Ring tailed lemur
 Asian small-clawed otter
 South American coati
 South American tapir

Birds

 Dusky lory
 Black lory
 Coconut lorikeet
 Blue-and-yellow macaw
 Lesser flamingo
 Black swan
 Australian pelican
 African penguin
 Javan hawk eagle
 South African ostrich
 Southern cassowary
 Rhinoceros hornbill
 Triton cockatoo
 Palm cockatoo

Reptile
 Saltwater crocodile
 False gharial
 Komodo dragon
 Green iguana
 Reticulated python
 Dwarf caiman
 Argus monitor
 Painted terrapin
 Aldabra giant tortoise

References

External links

Zoos in Indonesia
1956 establishments in Indonesia
Zoos established in 1956
Tourist attractions in Yogyakarta